Life FM (callsign: 2WLF) is a Christian radio station in Wagga Wagga, New South Wales, which broadcasts on 101.9 MHz n the FM.

In 2006 Life FM relocated its studios to the Wagga Wagga Christian College.

References

Community radio stations in Australia
Radio stations in Wagga Wagga
Christian radio stations in Australia